Ezz Steel is the largest steel company in Egypt, the Middle East and North Africa Region. Ezz Steel has its head office in the Four Seasons Nile Plaza, Garden City, Greater Cairo.

Ezz Steel is listed on the Egyptian Exchange under the ticker symbol "ESRS". and has GDRs listed on the London Stock Exchange under the ticker symbol "AEZD".

Ezz Steel holds a 55% stake Al-Ezz Dekheila Steel Co. (EZDK) in Alexandria, a 64% direct and indirect stake in Al-Ezz Flat Steel Company (EFS) in Suez and a 99% of Al-Ezz Rolling Mills Company (ERM) in 10th of Ramadan City.

Ezz Steel was established as the Alexandria National Iron and Steel Company (ANSDK) in 1982 by industrialist Ibrahim Salem Mohammedin, who also served as its chairman from 1982 until 2001. It started production at 1986. The old name for the company was Alexandria National Iron and Steel Company, ANSDK. The company was owned by a group of banks and petroleum companies as well as a Japanese consortium.

Ezz Steel operates four steel plants in Alexandria, Sadat City, Suez, and 10th of Ramadan City. In addition, its mother company holds the majority stake in Al-Ezz Ceramics and Porcelain Company which produces ceramic and porcelain tiles under the brand name "GEMMA" and "Al-Jawhara" .

Ezz Steel is ranked 87th of the world biggest steel producers as per the 2015 World Steel Association Ranking with total production capacity of 3.2 million tons per year (2015), representing more than half of Egypt total annual production of 6 million tons.

Ahmed Ezz was the Chairman and Managing Director of EZDK, As he submitted his resignation in 2011 after 25 January Revolution. Mr Farouk Zaki Ibrahim is the current Chairman of EZDK.

Paul Chekaiban is the current Chairman and Managing Director of Ezz Steel.

See also

 List of steel producers

References

External links 
 Ezz Industries Website
 Arab Steel Website
 Middle East Steel Website
 World Steel Institute Website

Steel companies of Egypt
Manufacturing companies based in Cairo
Egyptian brands